Lakhuria is a village located in the district of Purba Bardhaman, West Bengal, India.

References

Villages in Purba Bardhaman district